Apollon Limassol Basketball Club, is an Cypriot basketball club. The team competes in the Cyprus Basketball Division A, the top tier of Cypriot basketball. The team represents the city of Limassol, Cyprus.

Having been one of the founding members of the Cyprus Basketball Division A, Apollon Limassol have been a regular in the first division for many years. Despite this, the team has yet to see significant success both domestically and internationally.

History

The Apollon Limassol sports club was founded in the year 1954, the basketball section of Apollon Limassol was formed in 1967. The team was one of the original founding member of the Cyprus Basketball Federation, one of the first professional basketball leagues in Cyprus. 

Since the teams inception in 1967, Apollon Limassol has regularly participated in the Cyprus Basketball Division A, the first tier of Cypriot Basketball. The titles in the history of the basketball department are Cypriot Basketball Cups in 2002 and 2014, and a Super Cup in 2004-05.

Despite having stayed in the first tier for many years, Apollon Limassol have yet to achieve greater success in the league. Having failed to win the league since its inception, and as well as having not finished runners-up in the league since 2001.

Apollon Limassol have briefly participated in international competitions such as the now defunct FIBA Korać Cup and the FIBA EuroChallenge, however, the team has not participated in any competitions internationally since 2013. Recently, the team lack of success domestically has proven it difficult to qualify for either the Basketball Champions League or the FIBA Europe Cup.

Season by season

Honours
Total titles: 3

Domestic competitions
Cypriot Championship
Runners-up: 1999, 2000, 2001
Cypriot Cup
Winners: 2002, 2014
Runners-up: 2004
Cypriot Super Cup
Winners: 2005
Runners-up: 2002, 2014

European competitions
 FIBA EuroCup Challenge 
 Semifinalist (1): 2006–07

European cups
 1999–00: Korać Cup
 2000–01: Korać Cup: lost to  Hemofarm Vršac in eliminations
 2001–02: Korać Cup
 2002–03: FIBA Regional Challenge Final 4
 2003–04: FIBA Europe Cup: took 2nd place (2-2) in Group D of South Conference
 2004–05: FIBA Europe Cup: took 3rd place (1-3) in Conference South Group C
 2005–06: EuroCup Challenge: took 1st place (3-1) in Group G, lost to  Khimik in 1/8 Finals
 2006–07: Europe Cup Challenge: took 1st place (4-2) in Group A, lost to  Samara 77–75, 50–76 in the Semifinals
 2012–13: EuroChallenge: took 4th place (1–5) in Group G

Current roster

Notable players

  Sam Jones
  Kenny Satterfield
  Joey Dorsey

Notable managers

  Guillermo Vecchio

External links
 http://www.apollonbc.net/ Apollon BC Official Site 
 http://www.apollon1954.com/ Apollon Limassol News
 http://www.fygas.net/  Apollon Limassol Fan Page
 Eurobasket.com Apollon Limassol BC Page

Basketball teams in Cyprus
Basketball teams established in 1967
Sport in Limassol